Alfonso Orlando (17 May 1892 - 29 August 1969) was an Italian long-distance runner who competed at the 1912 Summer Olympics, After completing his sports career, he interested his in the art world, so that he recited in the movie A Man Named John (1963).

National records
 3000 metres: 9:24.4 (Milan, 20 June 1912) - record holder until 8 July 1913.
 5000 metres: 9:24.4 (Milan, 20 June 1912) - record holder until 8 July 1913.
 10,000 metres: 32:57.2 (Milan, 12 May 1912) - record holder until 26 September 1914.

National titles
Orlando won two national championships at individual senior level.

Italian Athletics Championships
5000 metres: 1911, 1912 (2)

See also
 Italy at the 1912 Summer Olympics

References

External links
 
 Alfonso Orlando: passi corti, cuore grande 

1892 births
1969 deaths
Athletes (track and field) at the 1912 Summer Olympics
Italian male long-distance runners
Italian male actors
Olympic athletes of Italy
Sportspeople from the Province of Salerno